Television in Mauritania was introduced in 1980 with experimental broadcasts, with regular broadcasts starting in 1982.

Télédiffusion de Mauritanie offers private and public channels through satellite television in the Arabsat satellites Badr-4 and Arabsat-5C. There is also easy access to pan-Arab and European satellite television.

History
Television in Mauritania started as a project in 1980, with regular broadcasts starting with the Office of Radio and Television of Mauritania (ORTM) in 1982, broadcasting news bulletins and other programming. On 10 July 1984, television in Mauritania as a whole began to appear as autonomous due to Iraqi aid, as it began broadcasting from its own studios, independent from its radio counterpart.

Mass media in Mauritania was a state monopoly until a law liberalising the audiovisual space in the country passed in the National Assembly on 2 July 2010, with the first private media being authorised by the High Authority for Press and Audiovisual (HAPA) on 23 August 2011.

Main channels
This is a list of TV channels based in Mauritania.

See also
 Media of Mauritania
 Telecommunications in Mauritania

References

Mass media in Mauritania
Mauritania